David Herrera Urias (born 1967) is an American lawyer serving as a United States district judge of the United States District Court for the District of New Mexico.

Early life and education 
Born in Pecos, Texas, Urias was raised in Albuquerque, New Mexico, the son of Estella Urias and David D. Urias. He has two siblings. He earned a Bachelor of Arts degree from the University of New Mexico in 1997 and a Juris Doctor from the University of New Mexico School of Law in 2001.

Career 
In 2001 and 2002, Urias served as a law clerk for Judge Vanessa Ruiz of the District of Columbia Court of Appeals. After his clerkship, Urias won the Fried Frank Civil Rights Fellowship. From 2002 to 2004, he was an associate at Fried, Frank, Harris, Shriver & Jacobson in New York City. From 2004 to 2008, he worked as a staff attorney for the Mexican American Legal Defense and Educational Fund. He joined Freedman Boyd Hollander Goldberg Urias & Ward, P.A. in 2008.

Federal judicial service 
On September 8, 2021, President Joe Biden announced his intent to nominate Urias to serve as a United States district judge of the United States District Court for the District of New Mexico. On September 20, 2021, his nomination was sent to the Senate. President Biden nominated Urias to the seat to be vacated by Judge Martha Vázquez, who will assume senior status in 2022. On November 3, 2021, a hearing on his nomination was held before the Senate Judiciary Committee. On December 2, 2021, his nomination was reported out of committee by a 12–10 vote. On December 17, 2021, the United States Senate invoked cloture on his nomination by a 45–25 vote. His nomination was confirmed that same day by a 45–26 vote. He received his judicial commission on January 14, 2022.

See also
 List of Hispanic/Latino American jurists

References

External links 

1967 births
Living people
21st-century American judges
21st-century American lawyers
Hispanic and Latino American judges
Hispanic and Latino American lawyers
Judges of the United States District Court for the District of New Mexico
New Mexico lawyers
People from Albuquerque, New Mexico
People from Pecos, Texas
United States district court judges appointed by Joe Biden
University of New Mexico alumni
University of New Mexico School of Law alumni